"Days Go By" is the debut single of British electronic group Dirty Vegas, released in the United Kingdom on 7 May 2001. It is from their self-titled debut album. The single's artwork was done by American artist Richard Phillips. The song initially peaked at number 27 on the UK Singles Chart.

In mid-2002, "Days Go By" became a US radio hit following its usage in a television advertisement for the 2003 Mitsubishi Eclipse, eventually peaking at number 14 on the Billboard Hot 100 and receiving the Grammy Award for Best Dance Recording in 2003. In the wake of its success in the US, it re-entered and peaked at number 16 on the UK Singles Chart, topped the UK Dance Singles Chart, and reached number six in Canada.

Music video

Two male dancers—one young and wearing a tracksuit; the other older and wearing a suit, tie, and braces—each perform a routine of popping, locking, the robot, and breakdancing outside a restaurant. The dancers represent the same man at two different periods in his life, as evidenced by the orange high-top Chuck Taylor All-Stars trainers they wear. The young man's trainers are clean and new, while those worn by the older man are faded, scuffed, and held together with tape.

One day out of every year, the older man travels to the restaurant and dances on the pavement from sunrise to sunset. He does so in the hope of bringing back a lost girlfriend, who gave him the orange trainers as a present when they were young but who ultimately left him because he could not stop dancing. The music pauses briefly while a few spectators voice their thoughts about the young woman's fate. At the end of the day, two of them leave to get a cup of coffee together; the older man catches a brief glimpse of his girlfriend's younger self, then picks up his belongings and leaves.

The video was filmed at Chroni's Famous Sandwich Shop in East Los Angeles, California. Garland Spencer and Byron McIntyre portrayed the dancer's younger and older selves, respectively.

There are two versions of the music video; one has the three band members observing from a table at the restaurant, while the other replaces those shots with footage of them in a silver Mitsubishi Eclipse stopped at a traffic light. In addition to the replaced shots, the Eclipse version of the video includes footage of the car arriving at and departing from a traffic light, suggesting that they arrived in the morning and remained at the light all day to watch the man dance.

Mitsubishi Eclipse advert
A Mitsubishi executive saw the music video for "Days Go By" in a hotel room, and personally tracked the group down to procure rights to feature the song in an advertisement. The song was licensed to be used in the Mitsubishi ad, which began airing in early 2002. A New York radio station began playing the song, which was subsequently released to rhythmic and top 40 radio stations in mid-2002. American brand awareness for Mitsubishi went from 44% to 60% following the use of the song in the commercial.

Track listings

Original release

UK and European CD single, UK cassette single
 "Days Go By" (7-inch mix)
 "Days Go By" (full vocal mix)
 "Days Go By" (acoustic)

UK 12-inch vinyl
A. "Days Go By" (full vocal mix)
B. "Days Go By" (Lucien Foort remix)

Belgian CD single
 "Days Go By" (radio edit)
 "Days Go By" (Lucien Foort Remix)

Canadian 12-inch vinyl
A1. "Days Go By" (Vegas Mix) – 6:06
B1. "Days Go By" (original extended) – 8:10
B2. "Days Go By" (Lucien Foort Remix) – 9:00

Re-release

UK CD1
 "Days Go By"
 "Days Go By" (Scumfrog vocal remix)
 "Days Go By" (Paul Oakenfold vocal remix)

UK CD2
 "Days Go By" (radio edit)
 "Days Go By" (Steve Osborne acoustic mix)
 "1979" (live—BBC Radio 1 Evening Session)
 "Days Go By" (video)

US promo CD 1
 "Days Go By" (Paul Oakenfold remix-vocal edit) – 3:33
 "Days Go By" (Paul Oakenfold remix-vocal) – 5:31
 "Days Go By" (Brancaccio & Aisher remix-vocal) – 6:40
 "Days Go By" (Lucien Foort Remix) – 8:59
 "Days Go By" (Jark Prongo mix) – 8:46

US promo CD 2
 "Days Go By" (single edit) – 3:41
 "Days Go By" (full vocal mix) – 8:08
 "Days Go By" (acoustic mix) – 2:43
 "Days Go By" (instrumental dub) – 6:10

One-track digital download
 "Days Go By" – 7:12

Three-track digital download
 "Days Go By" – 3:43
 "Days Go By" (Hydrogen Rockers vocal mix) – 6:51
 "Days Go By" (2001 acoustic) – 2:43

Charts

Weekly charts

Year-end charts

Release history

References

2001 songs
2001 debut singles
2002 singles
Dirty Vegas songs
Grammy Award for Best Dance Recording
Songs written by Victoria Horn
Capitol Records singles
Parlophone singles